Death Certificate may refer to:

Death certificate, a document concerning a person's death
Death Certificate (album), an album by rapper Ice Cube
"Death Certificate for a Beauty Queen", a single by metal band I Killed the Prom Queen